USCGC William Flores (WPC-1103) is a  cutter homeported in Coast Guard District 7, Miami, Florida.

Design

Like her sister ships, she is equipped for coastal security patrols, interdiction of drug and people smugglers, and search and rescue. Like the smaller  she is equipped with a stern launching ramp. The ramp allows the deployment and retrieval of her high speed water-jet powered pursuit boat without first coming to a stop.

Operational history

On 1 April 2016, William Flores intercepted a small boat with twelve Cuban refugees on board. The refugees had gone off course, and had entered Bahamas territory.

Namesake

At the cost of his own life Flores stayed aboard the capsizing cutter and used his belt to tie open a life jacket locker door. This action allowed life jackets to float on to the water as the cutter went down. He further distributed life jackets to shipmates in the water.
In November 2011 Flores was honored by having the third Coast Guard Sentinel-class cutter named after him.

References

Sentinel-class cutters
Ships of the United States Coast Guard
2011 ships
Ships built in Lockport, Louisiana